Val d'Isère Skiing and Snowboarding is a skiing and snowboarding video game developed by Virtual Studio and published by Atari Corporation for the Atari Jaguar first in North America on December 9, 1994. It was later released in Europe in January 1995 and finally in Japan on July of the same year, where it was published by Messe Sansao. It is a conversion of the SNES title Tommy Moe's Winter Extreme: Skiing & Snowboarding, which was done by the same team at Loriciels and released in 1994 on all regions.

Named after and set in the French Val-d'Isère ski resort, Val d'Isère Skiing and Snowboarding features freeride, training and competition modes and players can choose between skiing and snowboarding gameplay styles. It also features in-game advertising promoting the FILA sportswear store. While it inherits some of the game design and mechanics from its original SNES counterpart, the conversion features a different map and completely new trail layouts.

Val d'Isère Skiing and Snowboarding received mixed reviews, and as of April 1, 1995 the game has sold nearly 10,000 copies though it is unknown how many were sold in total during its lifetime. Retrospective reviews have been equally as mixed.

Gameplay 

Val d'Isère Skiing and Snowboarding is a winter sports game that uses a behind-the-view perspective, similar  to Tommy Moe's Winter Extreme: Skiing & Snowboarding. When racing down the skiing trails, the player can accelerate, turn, stop, jump, decelerate and make sharp turns either when accelerating or decelerating. The players can choose either snowboard or ski playstyles at the main menu and change the default control scheme at the options menu. Unlike its original SNES version, however, in-game weather conditions changes do not exist. Two players can also participate in any of the modes by taking their respective turn. Progress, records and other changes made by the player are saved automatically via the cartridge's internal EEPROM. More options can be accessed by entering a cheat code at the main menu.

Modes 
Val d'Isère Skiing and Snowboarding has three different modes of play: Freeride, Training and Compete. Each one having their own subset of rules. Freeride is an arcade-style, non-competitive event mode in which the player has to descend from the mountain and reach the finish line of the track. At the start of any course, the player is given a limited amount of time to reach a designated checkpoint and increase the time limit to continue racing, while avoiding obstacles in order to not lose time. After reaching down the bottom of the mountain, the player automatically uses a ski lift in order to climb to the next mountain trail. More paths are unlocked depending on the route the player has chosen when descending from the mountain's skiing trail. If the players misses a checkpoint, the time limit stays the same, leading to an early end to the race as a result. Later paths get increasingly difficult as the player progresses in this mode, with more obstacles to avoid and lower time limits, in addition, these later courses add power ups such as turbo, shield and time increasers.

Training mode is recommended for beginners to practice and refine their ski and snowboard skills for the competition modes of downhill, slalom and giant. Before the start of any event, the player is given the choice of selecting any of the four courses on the map screen, each one increasing in difficulty. If the player misses any gate, there is a penalty of two seconds for each one lost at the end of the practice.

Compete mode, as the name suggests, is a competitive mode consisting of four championships, each of which is divided into three events. In the first event, the player has to be in the top 7 to qualify, then in the top 5 on the second event and then in the top 3 on the third and final event to win an award, depending on the time the player reached the finish line. If the player qualifies on the four championships, then he is moved on onto the finals. If the player fails to qualify in any of the events, a life is lost and once the three lives are lost in qualifying, the game is over. Unlike the previous two modes, progress is not saved after completing any event.

Development and release 
Val d'Isère Skiing and Snowboarding was developed by the same personnel who developed Tommy Moe's Winter Extreme: Skiing & Snowboarding on the Super Nintendo Entertainment System at Virtual Studio. In an interview with Vincent Baillet, one of the programmers of the game, remarked his experience when it came to develop for the system, pointing out both the advantages and disadvantages that it had compared to the SNES. Vincent worked on the project before Loriciels went bankrupt, which resulted in his departure from the company but before doing so, he worked on displaying the slopes, sprites and sound effects. After leaving the company, Olivier Richez did the remaining programming work for the game. He also stated that the game received changes prior to release. The game was also present during WCES 1995.

Reception 

Val d'Isère Skiing and Snowboarding garnered mixed reception upon release.

Sarah Nade of GamePro rated the game's graphics and "fun factor" at 4.5/5.0.

Next Generation reviewed the game, and stated that "A fair game that won't stand the test of time."

Entertainment Weekly gave the game a B+.

Notes

References

External links 
 
 Val d'Isère Skiing and Snowboarding at AtariAge
 Val d'Isère Skiing and Snowboarding at GameFAQs
 Val d'Isère Skiing and Snowboarding at MobyGames

1994 video games
Atari games
Atari Jaguar games
Atari Jaguar-only games
Multiplayer and single-player video games
Skiing video games
Snowboarding video games
Sports video games set in France
Video games developed in France
Virtual Studio games